Rhodographa is a monotypic moth genus in the subfamily Arctiinae. Its single species, Rhodographa phaeoplaga, is found in São Paulo, Brazil. Both the genus and species were first described by William Schaus in 1899.

References

Lithosiini
Monotypic moth genera
Moths of South America